Drosophila acanthos is a species of fly in the genus Drosophila.

References 

acanthos
Insects described in 2003